Albula may refer to:

Places
Albula, an old (possibly legendary) name of the Tiber river

Switzerland
Albula Range, a mountain range
Albula (river), a tributary of the Hinterrhein
Albula District, a district in canton Graubünden until 2017
Albula/Alvra, a municipality
Albula Pass
Albula Railway, part of the Rhaetian Railway
Albula Region, which replaced Albula District in 2017
Albula Tunnel, located on the Albula Railway

Zoology

Moths
Agrisius albula, a moth of family Erebidae
Dichomeris albula, a moth of family Gelechiidae
Machimia albula, a moth of family Oecophoridae
Meganola albula, a moth of family Nolidae
Metasia albula, a moth of family Crambidae
Nevadopalpa albula, a moth of family Gelechiidae
Nodozana albula, a moth of family Erebidae
Spodoptera albula, a moth of family Noctuidae

Other species
Albula (fish), a genus of ray-finned fish
Coregonus albula, a whitefish of family Salmonidae
Eurema albula, a butterfly of family Pieridae
Hastula albula, a sea snail of family Terebridae
Menestho albula, a sea snail of family Pyramidellidae
Phaeopate albula, a beetle of family Cerambycidae
Stephanasterias albula, a starfish of family Asteriidae